The Košice Region is one of the eight Slovak administrative regions. The region was first established in 1923 and its present borders were established in 1996. It consists of 11 districts (okresy) and 440 municipalities, 17 of which have a town status. About one third of the region's population lives in the agglomeration of Košice, which is its main economic and cultural centre.

Geography
It is located in the southern part of eastern Slovakia and covers an area of 6,752 km2. The western part of the region is composed of the eastern part of the Slovak Ore Mountains, including its subdivisions: Slovak Karst, Slovak Paradise, Volovské vrchy, Čierna hora. The Hornád Basin is located in the northwest. The area between Slovak Ore Mountains and Slanské vrchy is covered by the Košice Basin, named after the city. The area east of Slanské vrchy is covered by the Eastern Slovak Lowland and there is a volcanic range, Vihorlat Mountains, in the northeast, close to the Ukrainian border. Bigger rivers include Slaná in the southwest, Hornád in the west and centre, Uh and Bodrog in the east, along with a small part of the Tisza river in the extreme southeast. As for administrative divisions, the region borders Prešov Region in the north, Zakarpattia Oblast of Ukraine in the east, Szabolcs-Szatmár-Bereg and Borsod-Abaúj-Zemplén counties of Hungary in the south and the Banská Bystrica Region in the west.

Demographics
The average population density in the region is 117.9 inhabitants per km2, which is very similar to the country's average (110 per km2). The largest towns are Košice, Michalovce, Spišská Nová Ves, Trebišov and Rožňava. According to the 2001 census, there were 766,012 inhabitants in the region, with a majority of Slovaks (81.8%), but there is a numerous Hungarian minority (11.2%) in the south, and there are minorities of Roma (3.9%) and Czechs (<1%).

Economy
The economy of the Košice region accounted for 11.47% of Slovakia's GDP in 2013, which made it the region with the second highest GDP in Slovakia after the Bratislava region. However, it lags behind the majority of Slovakia's regions in GDP per capita.

The salaries are on average 40% higher in the Bratislava region than in the Košice region, but the living costs are considerably higher there as well.

The unemployment in the region was at 15.6% in 2014.

Politics
Current governor of Košice region is Rastislav Trnka (Independent). He won with 37,8 %. In election 2017 was elected also regional parliament :

Administrative division
The Košice Region consists of 11 districts. In Košice city itself there are four districts; seven districts are outside the city. There are 440 municipalities, of which 17 are towns.

See also
Košice Self-governing Region

References

External links
Košický samosprávny kraj Official website

 
Regions of Slovakia